Abdelkader Tlemçani (born 1 December 1963 in Oran) is an Algerian football manager and former international player.

Honours

Clubs
USM Bel Abbès
Algerian Cup: 1991

Raja Casablanca
 Moroccan Championship: Runner-up 1993

MC Oran
 Algerian Championship: Runner-up 1995

External links
 Player profile - dzfootball

1963 births
Footballers from Oran
Living people
Algerian footballers
Algerian expatriate footballers
Algeria international footballers
Association football forwards
RCG Oran players
ASM Oran players
USM Bel Abbès players
MC Oran players
WA Mostaganem players
Ligue 1 players
Expatriate footballers in Morocco
21st-century Algerian people